Richard Daniel "Rip" Conway (April 18, 1896 – December 2, 1972) was an American baseball second baseman who played in Major League Baseball for the Boston Braves in .

Born in White Bear Lake, Minnesota, Conway played in the Eastern League (EL) in 1917, posting a .309 batting average for the Worcester Busters. Conway played his only Major League season in 1918, batting .167 with 2 RBI in 14 games. In March 1919, the Southern Association's (SA) Memphis Chickasaws acquired him. Conway played for three teams in 1919: the SA's Chickasaws and Mobile Bears, and the Texas League's Fort Worth Panthers; he batted a combined .247. With the EL's Worcester Boosters, he batted .329 in 1921, with nine home runs. From 1922 to 1924, Conway played for two EL teams each year; these included the Boosters, Hartford Senators, Worcester Panthers, and Waterbury Brasscos. In 1923, he had a combined .347 batting average for the Senators and Panthers.

References

External links

Rip Conway

Major League Baseball second basemen
Boston Braves players
Fort Worth Panthers players
Hartford Senators players
Memphis Chickasaws players
Mobile Bears players
Waterbury Brasscos players
Worcester Boosters players
Worcester Busters players
Worcester Panthers players
Baseball players from Minnesota
1896 births
1972 deaths